This article shows the rosters of all participating teams at the women's basketball tournament at the 2015 Pan American Games in Toronto. Rosters can have a maximum of 12 athletes.

Argentina
The Argentina women's national basketball team roster for the 2015 Pan American Games.

Brazil
The Brazil national team roster for the women's basketball tournament of the 2015 Pan American Games. The final 12 player squad was announced on May 25, 2015.

Canada
The Canada national team roster for the women's basketball tournament of the 2015 Pan American Games. Canada announced their squad on June 22, 2015.

Cuba
The Cuba women's national basketball team roster for the 2015 Pan American Games.

Dominican Republic
The Dominican Republic women's national basketball team roster for the 2015 Pan American Games.

Puerto Rico
The Puerto Rico women's national basketball team roster for the 2015 Pan American Games.

United States
The following is the United States roster in the women's basketball tournament of the 2015 Pan American Games.

Venezuela
The Venezuela women's national basketball team roster for the 2015 Pan American Games.

References

Basketball at the 2015 Pan American Games – Women's tournament
Basketball squads at the Pan American Games